FSU Gang may refer to:
 In a typical sense, it means to cause destruction, usually public or of another person's property. Or generally "causing a scene". Or messing up somehow or making an error.

The street gang calling itself “FSU” was started by Bruce Sartwell in 1988. The group developed from a hate for fascist, neonazi-skinheads and Hammerskins in Portland, Maine and New Haven Connecticut. The group became known for beating and robbing minority groups including blacks, Latinos, Jewish people and homosexuals, frequently for drugs and money, which they later sold themselves. The gang self-released a series of videos to evade law enforcement from their previous Hate Crimes entitled “Boston Beatdown Part One and Two”. The sole purpose of these self-created self-leaked videos was to re-frame their gang as suddenly anti-racist to evade law enforcement and arrest.
Music
"Fuck Shit Up", alternative title for "Mash It Up", a 2011 Karl Wolf single featuring Three 6 Mafia from his album Finally Free.
"Fuck Shit Up", a song by Dub Narcotic Sound System covered as "Fuck Shit Up (Dub Narcotic)", by American punk blues band The Jon Spencer Blues Explosion from their 1996 album Now I Got Worry
Definition Of Fuck Shit Vol. 1, an album by Alley Boy 
”Fuck Shit Up (Whanana),” a song by Wingnut Dishwashers Union on the album Burn the Earth! Leave it Behind!
Various
Friends Stand United, aka FSU (originally standing for Fuck Shit Up), US national organization (classified by FBI as a street gang, a distinction that FSU members deny), an anti-racist group which includes members of various ethnicities

See also
Fuck (disambiguation)
Shit (disambiguation)